The men's 100 metre butterfly event at the 2000 Summer Olympics took place on 21–22 September at the Sydney International Aquatic Centre in Sydney, Australia.

Competing at his third Games, Lars Frölander ended Sweden's 20-year drought to become an Olympic champion in the event, since Pär Arvidsson did so in 1980. Surprised by a massive home crowd, he overhauled Australia's top favorites Michael Klim and Geoff Huegill on the final 25 metres to snatch a gold medal in a new European record of 52.00. Klim added a silver to his two relay golds from the Games, in a time of 52.18, while Huegill took home the bronze in 52.22, handing an entire medal pool for the Aussies with an unexpected two–three finish.

At 18 years of age, U.S. teenage swimmer Ian Crocker came up with a spectacular swim to earn a fourth spot in an American record of 52.44. Meanwhile, Canada's Mike Mintenko shared a fifth-place tie with Japan's Takashi Yamamoto in a matching standard of 52.58. Germany's Thomas Rupprath and Russia's Anatoly Polyakov closed out the field with a joint seventh-place finish (53.13).

Earlier in the semifinals, Huegill became the second fastest of all-time in swimming history to break a 52-second barrier, establishing a new Olympic record of 51.96.

Records
Prior to this competition, the existing world and Olympic records were as follows.

The following new world and Olympic records were set during this competition.

Results

Heats

Semifinals

Semifinal 1

Semifinal 2

Final

References

External links
Official Olympic Report

B
Men's 100 metre butterfly
Men's events at the 2000 Summer Olympics